Each "article" in this category is a collection of entries about several stamp issuers, presented in alphabetical order. The entries are formulated on the micro model and so provide summary information about all known issuers.

See the :Category:Compendium of postage stamp issuers page for details of the project.

Spain 

Dates 	1850 –
Capital 	Madrid
Currency  	(1850) 8  = 1 real
		(1866) 80  = 100 centimos = 1 escudo
		(1867) 1000 milesimas = 100 centimos = 80  = 1 escudo
		(1872) 100 centimos = 1 peseta
		(2002) 100 cent = 1 euro

Main Article Postage stamps and postal history of Spain

See also 	Canary Islands

Spanish Guinea 

Dates 	1902–1960
Capital 	Santa Isabel
Currency  	100 centimos = 1 peseta

Main Article Postage stamps and postal history of Equatorial Guinea

Includes 	Elobey, Annobon & Corisco;
		Fernando Poo;
		Rio Muni

Spanish Marianas 

Dates 	1898–1899
Capital 	
Currency  	100 centimos = 1 peseta

Refer 	Spanish Philippines

See also 	Mariana Islands

Spanish Morocco 

Dates 	1914–1956
Capital 	Tetuan
Currency  	100 centimos = 1 peseta

Main Article Needed

Spanish Philippines 

Dates 	1854–1898
Capital 	Manila
Currency  	(1854) 20  = 1 real; 8 reales = 1 peso
		(1864) 100 centimos = 1 peso
		(1871) 100 centimos = 1 escudo
		(1872) 100 centimos = 1 peseta
		(1876) 1000 milesimas = 100 centavos = 1 peso

Main Article Needed 

Includes 	Spanish Marianas

Spanish Post Offices Abroad 

Main Article Needed 

Includes 	Morocco (Spanish Post Offices);
		Tangier (Spanish Post Office);
		Tetuan (Spanish Post Office)

Spanish Sahara 

Dates 	1924–1975
Capital 	El Aaiun
Currency  	100 centimos = 1 peseta

Refer 	Spanish West Africa

Spanish West Africa 

The general issue was for use in Ifni and Spanish Sahara.

Dates 	1949–1951
Currency  	100 centimos = 1 peseta

Main Article Needed 

Includes 	Cape Juby;
		Ifni;
		La Aguëra;
		Rio de Oro;
		Spanish Sahara

Srba Hrvata Slovena 

Refer 	Yugoslavia

Sremsko Baranjska Oblast (Croatia) 

After Croatia recovered Krajina and Eastern Slavonia from the autonomous republic of Srpska Krajina
in 1995, Eastern Slavonia was placed under UN administration and called Sremsko Baranjska Oblast
(Srem and Baranya Region).  Stamps were issued soon afterwards.

Postal administration was transferred back to Croatia on 19 May 1997 and separate issues ceased at that time.
Eastern Slavonia as a whole was incorporated back into the Republic of Croatia on 15 January 1998.

Dates 	1995–1997
Capital 	
Currency  	100 paras = 1 dinar

Refer 	Croatia

See also 	Srpska Krajina (Croatia)

Sri Lanka 

Dates 	1972 –
Capital 	Colombo
Currency  	100 cents = 1 rupee

Main Article Postage stamps and postal history of Sri Lanka

See also 	Ceylon

Srpska 

Refer 	Bosnian Serb Republic

Srpska Krajina (Croatia) 

After Croatia declared itself independent of Yugoslavia in 1991, Croatian Serbs in Krajina, Western Slavonia and Eastern Slavonia proclaimed their allegiance to Yugoslavia and formed the Republic of Srpska Krajina under UN protection.  Elections for a president and parliament were held in January 1994.

In 1995, the Republic of Croatia began to recover the Serb territories.  Krajina and Western Slavonia were incorporated back into Croatia that year while Eastern Slavonia was placed under UN administration and called Sremsko Baranjska Oblast (Srem and Baranya Region).

Stamps were issued soon after Srpska Krajina was proclaimed and continued until the Croatian recovery of Krajina.  Later issues were made by Sremsko Baranjska Oblast (q.v.).

Dates 	1993–1995
Capital	
Currency  	100 paras = 1 dinar

Refer 	Croatia

See also 	Sremsko Baranjska Oblast (Croatia)

Stadt Post Basel 

Refer 	Basle

Stampalia 

Refer 	Astypalaea

Stellaland Republic 

A temporary Boer republic was established in Stellaland, which was the area surrounding Vryburg, on 26 July 1882.  In 1885 it was annexed by Britain and incorporated into British Bechuanaland.

There was one local issue of six stamps on 1 February 1884.

Dates 	1884–1885
Capital 	Vryburg
Currency  	12 pence = 1 shilling; 20 shillings = 1 pound

Refer 	Cape of Good Hope

See also 	Vryburg

Stockholm 

Dates 	1856–1862
Currency  	(1855)  48 skilling = 1 riksdaler
		(1858) 100 ore = 1 riksdaler

Refer 	Sweden

Straits Settlements 

Dates 	1867–1942
Capital 	Singapore
Currency  	100 cents = 1 dollar

Includes 	Labuan

Strasbourg 

Refer 	Council of Europe (Strasbourg)

Sudan 

Earliest issues were Egyptian stamps overprinted SOUDAN.

Dates 	1897 –
Capital 	Khartoum
Currency  	1000 milliemes = 100 piastres = 1 pound

Main Article Postage stamps and postal history of Sudan

Sudetenland 

Refer 	Asch (Sudetenland)

Suez Canal Company 

During the construction period 1859–69, the company ran a mail service that was taken over by the Egyptian
government in 1868.  Some special stamps (unofficial only) were issued in 1868.

Refer 	Egypt

Suidafrika 

Refer 	South Africa

Sumatra (Japanese Occupation) 

Dates 	1943–1945
Currency 	100 cents = 1 gulden

Refer 	Japanese Occupation Issues

Sungei Ujong 

Dates 	1878–1895
Capital 	Seremban
Currency  	100 cents = 1 dollar

Main Article Needed 

See also 	Malaysia

Suomi 

Refer 	Finland

Surinam/Suriname 

Dates 	1873 –
Capital 	Paramaribo
Currency  	100 cents = 1 gulden

Main Article Postage stamps and postal history of Suriname

Sverige 

Refer 	Sweden

Swaziland 

Dates 	1933 –
Capital 	Mbabane
Currency  	(1889) 12 pence = 1 shilling; 20 shillings = 1 pound
		(1961) 100 cents = 1 rand
		(1974) 100 cents = 1 lilangeni (note: plural is emalangeni)

Main Article Postage stamps and postal history of Swaziland

Includes 	Swaziland (Provisional Government)

Swaziland (Provisional Government) 

Dates 	1889–1894
Capital 	Mbabane
Currency  	12 pence = 1 shilling; 20 shillings = 1 pound

Refer 	Swaziland

Sweden 

Dates 	1855 –
Capital 	Stockholm
Currency  	(1855) 48 skilling = 1 riksdaler
		(1858) 100 ore = 1 riksdaler
		(1875) 100 ore = 1 krona

Includes 	Stockholm

Swiss Cantonal Administration 

Refer 	Basle;
		Geneva;
		Switzerland;
		Zurich

Swiss Cantonal Issues 

Main Article Needed 

Includes 	Basle;
		Geneva;
		Zurich

Swiss PTT 

Refer 	United Nations (UN)

Swiss Transitional Issues 

Refer 	Geneva;
		Switzerland;
		Zurich

Switzerland 

Dates 	1850 –
Capital 	Bern
Currency 	(1850) 100 rappen = 1 franken
		(1862) 100 centimes = 1 franc

See also 	Swiss Cantonal Issues

Syme 

Italian colony in the Dodecanese which used the general EGEO issues and had its own stamps inscribed
SIMI, the Italian (and Greek) name of the island.

Dates 	1912–1932
Capital 	Simi
Currency  	100 centesimi = 1 lira

Refer 	Aegean Islands (Dodecanese)

Syria 

Dates 	1924 –
Capital 	Damascus
Currency  	100 centimes = 1 piastre

Main Article Postage stamps and postal history of Syria

See also 	United Arab Republic (UAR)

Syria (French Occupation) 

Issues in both Egyptian and Syrian currency overprinted TEO or OMF.

Dates 	1919–1924
Currency 	(1919) 40 paras = 10 milliemes = 1 piastre
		(1920) 100 centimes = 1 piastre

Refer 	French Occupation Issues

Szechwan 

Dates 	1933 only
Currency 	100 cents = 1 dollar

Refer 	Chinese Provinces

Szeged 

Dates 	1919 only
Capital 	Szeged
Currency 	100 filler = 1 korona

Main Article Needed 

See also 	Hungary

Yugoslavia 

Overprints on Yugoslav stamps issued in Trieste.

Refer 	Trieste (Yugoslav Military Government)

References

Bibliography
 Stanley Gibbons Ltd, Europe and Colonies 1970, Stanley Gibbons Ltd, 1969
 Stanley Gibbons Ltd, various catalogues
 Stuart Rossiter & John Flower, The Stamp Atlas, W H Smith, 1989
 XLCR Stamp Finder and Collector's Dictionary, Thomas Cliffe Ltd, c.1960

External links
 AskPhil – Glossary of Stamp Collecting Terms
 Encyclopaedia of Postal History

Sp